Edward John Stanley, 18th Earl of Derby,  (21 April 1918 – 28 November 1994), styled Lord Stanley from 1938 to 1948, was a British peer, landowner and businessman.

Background and education
The eldest son of Lord Stanley and the Hon. Sibyl Cadogan, daughter of Viscount Chelsea, his grandfather was Edward Stanley, 17th Earl of Derby, a British Ambassador to Paris.

He was educated at Eton and Magdalen College, Oxford. His father having died in 1938, he succeeded his grandfather in the earldom and other family titles.

Military service
John Stanley served with the Grenadier Guards in the Second World War, being promoted to Major, and was awarded the Military Cross for gallantry during the Italian Campaign. After the war, he was appointed, in 1947, Lieutenant-Colonel of the King's Regiment (Territorial Army), and then as Colonel of the 5th/8th (Volunteer) Battalion, King's Regiment between 1947 and 1951. He continued as Colonel of the renamed 4th (Volunteer) Battalion, Queen's Lancashire Regiment (TAVR) between 1951 and 1967, and then as Colonel of the 1st Battalion, Liverpool Scottish (TA) from 1964, as well as Colonel of the 1st and 2nd Battalions, Lancastrian Volunteers (TA) between 1967 and 1975.

He was also honorary Captain of the Mersey Division of the Royal Naval Reserve.

Civilian career
A Deputy Lieutenant of Lancashire between 1946 and 1951, Lord Derby was appointed Lord Lieutenant of Lancashire in 1951 in which capacity he served until 1968.

Knowsley Village benefited from his gift of St Mary's Church of England school, playing fields and cottage to the Church Commissioners in 1949, followed by the transfer of the parish benefice to the diocese of Liverpool.

Stanley High School, Southport, which he opened in 1952, was named after him.

He held the honorary titles of Constable of Lancaster Castle between 1972 and 1994, and Pro-Chancellor of Lancaster University between 1964 and 1971.

A director of Martins Bank and of Granada Television, Lord Derby created Knowsley Safari Park in 1971 on his ancestral estate.

The Earl of Derby Scout Troop planted a tree and erected a stone plaque in the grounds of Knowsley Hall in celebration of the quincentenary (1985) of the earldom's creation. Stanley was an active freemason.

Family
Lord Derby married Isabel Milles-Lade, daughter of the Hon. Henry Milles-Lade, in 1948. Their marriage was childless.

Lady Derby died in 1990; Lord Derby survived her by four years and died in 1994, aged 76, being succeeded in the family titles by his nephew, Edward Stanley as the 19th Earl.

Thoroughbred horse racing
Following family tradition, Lord Derby was an owner of thoroughbred racehorses: his gelding Teleprompter won the 1984 Arlington Million at Arlington Park, Illinois.

Related article
 Epsom Derby

Arms

See also
 Earl of Derby
 House of Lords

References

External links

Kidd, Charles, Williamson, David (editors). Debrett's Peerage & Baronetage (1990 edition). New York: St Martin's Press, 1990.

1918 births
1994 deaths
Liverpool Scottish officers
D
D
S
S
D
D
S
D
D
18
John
Freemasons of the United Grand Lodge of England
British Army personnel of World War II
Grenadier Guards officers
Queen's Lancashire Regiment officers
Royal Naval Reserve personnel